Kim Ye-won (born August 19, 1998), better known by her stage name Umji, is a South Korean singer and dancer. She is a former member of the girl group GFriend, and a current member of the trio Viviz.

Early life 
Umji was born on August 19, 1998, in Incheon, South Korea and is the youngest daughter of her family (one older brother and one older sister). Her father is dentist and chairman of a famous dental corporation in South Korea.

Umji went to English preschool and graduated from Shinsong Middle School, Incheon. She graduated from the School of Performing Arts Seoul (SOPA - Theater Department) in February 2017, along with her groupmate, SinB.

Career 
Umji made her debut as a member of the group GFriend on January 15, 2015, with the release of the extended play Season of Glass, along with the single "Glass Bead". The group first live performance took place on the KBS2's Music Bank on January 16.

In September 2016, she released her first solo soundtrack for the South Korean drama Shopping King Louie, entitled "The Way". In October 2016, the singer stopped activities with the group after being diagnosed with a twist in the sarus muscle. She returned a month after recovering for the Melon Music Awards.

In November 2017, she took part in King of Mask Singer, participating in two rounds until she was eliminated by Sunwoo Jung-a.

In 2018, along with member Sanha from the boys band Astro, the singer was chosen to host a talk show for the youth audience entitled Yogobara.

In March 2020, the singer released her second soundtrack for the South Korean drama Welcome called "Welcome". In April 2020, she replaced her fellow group member Eunha as a new DJ for Naver Now "Avenger Girls".

In October 2020, Umji appeared with Eunha on the show Knowing Bros and showcased a tip of the single "Mago" from GFriend's studio album 回:Walpurgis Night released two weeks later on November 9.

On October 6, 2021, it was announced that Umji, along with former GFriend members, Eunha and SinB, have signed a contract with BPM Entertainment to debut as a trio. On October 8, 2021, it was announced their new group name would be Viviz.  Viviz debuted on February 9, 2022, with the extended play Beam of Prism.

Discography

Soundtrack appearances

Composition credits 
All song credits are adapted from the Korea Music Copyright Association's database unless stated otherwise.

Filmography

Radio show

References

External links 

 

Living people
1998 births
People from Incheon
K-pop singers
School of Performing Arts Seoul alumni
South Korean women pop singers
South Korean female idols
21st-century South Korean singers
21st-century South Korean women singers
South Korean television personalities
GFriend members
Viviz members
BPM Entertainment artists
Hybe Corporation artists